Against the Current (often abbreviated as ATC) is an American rock band from Poughkeepsie, New York, formed in 2011. The band currently consists of lead vocalist Chrissy Costanza, guitarist Dan Gow, and drummer Will Ferri. The band quickly gained a sizeable online following after posting covers of various popular songs on YouTube.

The band's first EP, Infinity, was released in May 2014 under their own label. The band followed Infinity with their next EP, Gravity, which was released on February 17, 2015. Shortly afterward, they signed to record label Fueled by Ramen. Their debut studio album, In Our Bones was released on May 20, 2016. Their second studio album, Past Lives was released on September 28, 2018. Their third EP, Fever, was released on July 23, 2021. On January 10, 2022 the single Wildfire was released. In August 2022 the band announced their departure from Fueled by Ramen, which made them independent again. On December 2, 2022 they released the single called Blindfolded.

History

Background and origins 
Against the Current was formed in early 2011 by Dan Gow, Will Ferri, and Jeremy Rompala and was later joined by Chrissy Costanza in the summer of 2011 after being introduced to Gow, Ferri, and Rompala through a mutual friend. Joe Simmons was invited to fill in as their bass player but later joined the band after leaving his former band.

Will Ferri is the younger brother of We Are the In Crowd bass player and artist manager Mike Ferri, as the bands manager Mike Ferri utilized his relationships with well known YouTube cover artists such as Kurt Hugo Schneider and Alex Goot to help the band achieve a considerable amount of fame via various covers of popular songs posted as collaborations on more established channels.

Music history 
In 2014, Joe Simmons & Jeremy Rompala split with the rest of the band.

On May 27, 2014, Against The Current released their debut EP, Infinity, independently through online distribution. The Infinity EP charted at No. 28 on the Heatseekers Albums. They began touring in support of the release of Infinity throughout most of 2014. After several tours, they entered the studio to record their second EP, Gravity, which was released on February 17, 2015. The EP featured six songs, and included a guest appearance from Taka of ONE OK ROCK on the song '"Dreaming Alone." A few weeks after the release of Gravity, Against the Current announced that they had been signed by the label Fueled By Ramen on March 4, 2015. The Gravity EP charted on four Billboard magazine charts, while it peaked on the Alternative Albums, Independent Albums, Rock Albums, and Heatseekers Albums charts, peaking at 23, 27, 36 and 4, respectively.

On May 22, 2015, the band announced their first headlining tour in support of the Gravity EP, called the Gravity World Tour. The tour spanned 4 months (August 2015 to November 2015), and included stops in several continents, including North America, Asia, and Europe.

On August 1, 2015, Against The Current announced that they had finished recording their first full-length album. On February 6, 2016, Against The Current announced their upcoming album's name, In Our Bones, as well as the release date, May 20, 2016. Their first studio album, In Our Bones, has been called "pop-rock perfection" by Alternative Press.

On September 14, 2017, Against The Current collaborated with Riot Games to create the single "Legends Never Die" for the 2017 League of Legends World Championship, published on Riot Games' YouTube channel. On November 4, 2017, Against The Current performed live at the 2017 League of Legends World Championship opening and closing ceremonies.

On May 11, 2018, Against The Current released two singles, "Strangers Again" and "Almost Forgot", from the album Past Lives, released on September 28, 2018. On August 17, 2018, the band released the single "Personal". The single "Voices" was released on September 14, 2018.

On October 28, 2020, Against The Current released their new song "That Won't Save Us," followed by a second single, "Weapon," on March 10, 2021. These were followed up by a third song "again & again" ft. Guardin on June 23, 2021. The bands first EP since 2015's "Gravity" called "fever" was released on July 23, 2021.

On January 10, 2022, Against the Current collaborated with League of Legends European Championship for a song called "Wildfire", with casters Vedius and Drakos as guest vocals, which is a part of a promotion for the 2022 Spring Season of its League of Legends esports regional league run. In August 2022, they announced that they were no longer signed to Fueled by Ramen.

Musical style
Against the Current's music is described as rock, punk, alternative rock, and synth-rock in publications. On their second album Past Lives, the band moves away from punk; in an interview with Billboard, Costanza reasons "We're all big fans of pop music; this is definitely the direction we’ve always wanted to head in. On this record, we were finally fearless and shed our skin. We wanted to create music that reflected our personalities now and also who we wanted to be."

Band members 

Current members
 Christina "Chrissy" Costanza – lead vocals (2011–present)
 Daniel "Dan" Gow – lead guitar, backing vocals (2011–present), rhythm guitar, bass (2014–present)
 William "Will" Ferri – drums, acoustic guitar, piano, keyboards, backing vocals (2011–present)

Former members
 Jeremy Rompala – rhythm guitar, piano (2011–2014)
 Joe Simmons – bass, backing vocals (2011–2014; touring 2014–2016)

Current touring members
 David Whitmore – bass, backing vocals (2020–present)

Former touring members
 Roo Buxton – rhythm guitar, lead guitar, keyboards, backing vocals (2015–2018)

 Jordan Eckes (We Are the In Crowd) – rhythm guitar, lead guitar, keyboards (2020–2022), backing vocals (2016–2022), bass (2016–2020)

Discography

Studio albums

Extended plays

Singles

References

External links 
 Official Site
 YouTube Channel

American pop rock music groups
Fueled by Ramen artists
Musical groups established in 2011
Musical groups from Poughkeepsie, New York
American musical trios
Female-fronted musical groups
2011 establishments in New York (state)